The VI Games of the Small States of Europe were held in 1997 in Reykjavík, Iceland.

Competitions

Medal count

Final Table:

References

Games of the Small States of Europe
 
Games Of The Small States Of Europe, 1997
Games Of The Small States Of Europe
Games Of The Small States Of Europe
Games Of The Small States Of Europe
Multi-sport events in Iceland
International sports competitions hosted by Iceland